Joselane "Josi" Santos (born 14 July 1984) is a Brazilian gymnast and freestyle skier.

Originally a gymnast competing at an international level for Brazil, she started freestyle skiing in 2013 and qualified for the FIS Freestyle Skiing World Cup.

In the women's aerials at the 2014 Winter Olympics in Sochi, Santos finished last at 22nd place. She dedicated her performance to Laís Souza whom she replaced after Souza was gravely hurt while training in Utah in January 2014.

References 

1984 births
Living people
Brazilian female freestyle skiers
Brazilian female artistic gymnasts
Freestyle skiers at the 2014 Winter Olympics
Olympic freestyle skiers of Brazil
South American Games gold medalists for Brazil
South American Games medalists in gymnastics
Competitors at the 1998 South American Games
Sportspeople from São Paulo
21st-century Brazilian women
20th-century Brazilian women